The prime minister of Spain, officially president of the Government, is the head of government of Spain. The office was established in its current form by the Constitution of 1978 and it was first regulated in 1823 as a chairmanship of the extant Council of Ministers, although it is not possible to determine when it actually originated.

Upon a vacancy, the Spanish monarch nominates a presidency candidate for a vote of confidence by the Congress of Deputies, the lower house of the Cortes Generales (parliament).  The process is a parliamentarian investiture by which the head of government is indirectly elected by the elected Congress of Deputies.  In practice, the prime minister is almost always the leader of the largest party in the Congress.  Since current constitutional practice in Spain calls for the king to act on the advice of his ministers, the prime minister is the country's de facto chief executive.

Pedro Sánchez of the Spanish Socialist Workers' Party (PSOE) has been prime minister since 2 June 2018, after a successful motion of no confidence against former prime minister Mariano Rajoy. The Sánchez government technically ceased on 29 April 2019 after the 2019 Spanish general election, but was acting afterwards. However, following the November 2019 general election, Sánchez earned a second mandate as prime minister after receiving a plurality of votes in the second round vote of his investiture at the Congress of Deputies on 7 January 2020. He then resumed being the official prime minister after he was sworn in by King Felipe on 8 January 2020. His new government was then sworn in by King Felipe on 13 January 2020.

Official title
The Spanish head of government has, since 1938, been known in Spanish as the  – literally "President of the Government", but the term 'president' is far older. Spain was not unique in this regard: it was one of several European parliamentary systems including France, Italy and Ireland that styled the head of government as 'presidents' of the government rather than the Westminster term of 'prime minister' (see President of the Council for the full list of corresponding terms); similarly, the president of the Congress or Senate referred to the parliamentary speakers. This system of multiple distinct offices all labelled 'president' causes confusion among English-speakers: both President George W. Bush and his brother, Florida governor Jeb Bush, referred to José María Aznar as "president" on separate occasions, and Donald Trump referred to Mariano Rajoy both as "President" and "Mr. President" during Rajoy's 2017 White House visit. While this term of address was not incorrect, it could be culturally misleading to or for English-speakers, so that "prime minister" is often used as an inexact but culturally equivalent term to ensure clarity.

This remained until 1939, when the Second Spanish Republic ended.

Origin

Since the 15th century, the Spanish monarch has delegated his executive powers in relevant personalities. Two are the most important: the validos and the secretaries of state. The validos, which existed since early 15th century to the late 17th century were people of the highest confidence of the kings and they exercised the Crown's power in the king's name. Since the 18th century, the validos disappeared and the secretaries of state were introduced. Both positions were de facto prime ministers, although they can not be completely compared.

On 19 November 1823, after a brief liberal democratic period called the Liberal Triennium between 1820 and 1823, King Ferdinand VII re-established the absolute monarchy and created the Council of Ministers that continues to exist today. This council was chaired by the secretary of state, who acted as prime minister. The Spanish Royal Statute of 1834 replaced the chair with a president of the Council of Ministers invested with executive powers.

During the nineteenth century, the position changed names frequently. After the Glorious Revolution of 1868, it was renamed President of the Provisional Revolutionary Joint and later President of the Provisional Government. In 1869, the office resumed the name of President of the Council of Ministers. Following the abdication of King Amadeus I, during the First Republic the office was the President of the Executive Power and was head of state. In 1874, the office name reverted to President of the Council of Ministers.

Since its inception, the prime minister has been appointed and dismissed by the will of the monarch. Successive constitutions have confirmed this royal prerogative of the monarch in the Constitution of 1837 (article 47), article 46 of the Constitution of 1845, the Constitution of 1869 (article 68), and the Constitution of 1876 (article 54).

With the fall of the republic and the restoration of the Bourbon dynasty on King Alfonso XII, the office maintained its original name until the dictatorship of Primo de Rivera, when it was renamed to President of the Military Directory. In 1925, the original name was restored again.

During the Second Republic the title was the same but when the Civil War started, the head of government among the Nationalists was called Chief of the Government of the State and since January 1938 the office acquired the current name, President of the Government, but between that date and 1973 the office was held by Francisco Franco as dictator of Spain.

The Republican Constitution of 1931 provided for the prime minister and the rest of the government to be appointed and dismissed by the president of the republic but they were responsible before the Parliament and the Parliament could vote to dismiss the prime minister or a minister even against the will of the president of the republic.

In 1973, Franco separated the head of state from the head of government, and that division still exists today, with the prime minister democratically elected by a Parliament which is itself elected by universal suffrage, free and equal.

Royal nomination and congressional confirmation
Once a general election has been announced by the king, political parties designate their candidates to stand for prime minister—usually the party leader. A prime minister is dismissed from office the day after the election, but remains in office as a caretaker until his/her successor is sworn in.

Following every general election to the Cortes Generales, and other circumstances provided for in the constitution, the king meets with and interviews the leaders of the parties represented in the Congress of Deputies, and then consults with the Speaker of the Congress of Deputies (officially, Presidente de Congreso de los Diputados, who, in this instance, represents the whole of the Cortes Generales and was himself elected from within the Congress to be the Speaker) before nominating a candidate for the presidency. This process is spelled out in Section 99 of Title IV. Often minor parties form part of a larger major party, and through that membership it can be said that the king fulfills his constitutional mandate of consulting with party representatives with Congressional representation.

Title IV Government and Administration, Section 99(1) & (2)
(1) After each renewal of the Congress and the other cases provided for under the Constitution, the King shall, after consultation with the representatives appointed by the political groups with parliamentary representation, and through the Speaker of the Congress, nominate for the Presidency of the Government.
(2) The candidate nominated in accordance with the provisions of the foregoing subsection shall submit to the Congress the political program of the Government he or she intends to form and shall seek the confidence of the House.

Under the Spanish Constitution of 1978, the prime minister and the Cabinet are responsible to the Congress of Deputies. Due to the need for the prime minister to command the confidence of the Congress, the monarch must nominate a candidate for the office after consulting the political groups with parliamentary representation. For this reason, the prime minister is usually the leader of the largest party in the Congress. For the Crown to nominate the political leader whose party controls the Congress can be seen as a royal endorsement of the democratic process—a fundamental concept enshrined in the 1978 Constitution.

By political custom established by Juan Carlos I since the ratification of the 1978 Constitution, the king's nominees have usually been from parties who maintain a plurality of seats in the Congress. However, there is no legal requirement for this. The largest party can end up not ruling if rival parties gather into a majority, forming a coalition—as happened in 2018 with the election of PSOE leader Sánchez. As political activity in Spain has effectively coalesced into a two-party system between the Spanish Socialist Workers' Party and the People's Party, the two major parties usually adopt some aspects of the minor party platforms in an effort to attract them into parliamentary pacts to edge out their rival party if no party is able to command an absolute majority of the Congress by themselves.

The monarch is normally able to announce his nominee on the day following a general election.

The monarch's order nominating a prime ministerial candidate is countersigned by the Speaker of the Congress, who then presents the nominee before the Congress of Deputies in a process known as a congressional investiture (Investidura parlamentaria). During the Investiture proceedings the nominee presents his political agenda in an Investiture Speech to be debated and submitted for a vote of confidence (Cuestión de confianza) by the Congress, effecting an indirect election of the head of government. A simple majority confirms the nominee and his program. At the moment of the vote, the confidence is awarded if the candidate receives a majority of votes in the first poll (currently 176 out of 350 MPs), but if the confidence is not awarded, a second vote is scheduled two days later in which a simple majority of votes cast (i.e., more "yes" than "no" votes) is required.

Oath of office 

After the nominee is confirmed, the Speaker of the Congress formally reports to the king of the congressional confirmation. The king then appoints the candidate as the new prime minister. The king's order of appointment is countersigned by the Speaker. During the swearing-in ceremony presided over by the king, customarily at the Salón de Audiencias in the Zarzuela Palace, the prime minister-elect of the Government takes an oath of office over an open Constitution and—at choice—next to a Bible and a crucifix. The prime minister must take the oath or affirmation placing the right hand on the Constitution. Currently, only one prime minister has refused to take the oath of office next to the Bible: Pedro Sánchez, along with most of his Cabinet members. His predecessor, Mariano Rajoy, a Catholic, put his right hand on the Constitution and, at the same time, his left hand on the Bible. As per tradition, if the members of the government choose not to take the oath along with any religious symbols, they use the word "prometo" ("I promise"), whereas if the take the oath with the Bible, they use the word "juro" ("I swear"). The oath as taken by Prime Minister Zapatero on his first term in office on 17 April 2004 was:

In 2008, from the time the king nominated José Luis Rodríguez Zapatero for a second term as prime minister immediately following the 2008 general election, almost a month passed before Zapatero was able to present his Investiture Speech before the Congress and stand for a Vote of Confidence. If no overall majority was obtained on the first Vote of the Confidence, then the same nominee and program is resubmitted for a second vote within forty-eight hours. Following the second vote, if confidence by the Congress is still not reached, then the monarch again meets with political leaders and the Speaker, and submits a new nominee for a vote of confidence. If, within two months, no candidate has won the confidence of the Congress then the king dissolves the Cortes and calls for a new general election. The king's royal decree is countersigned by the Speaker of the Congress.

Once appointed, the prime minister forms his government whose ministers are appointed and removed by the king on the prime minister's advice. In the political life of Spain, the king would already be familiar with the various political leaders in a professional capacity, and perhaps less formally in a more social capacity, facilitating their meeting following a general election. Conversely, nominating the party leader whose party maintains a plurality and who are already familiar with their party manifesto facilitates a smoother nomination process. In the event of coalitions, the political leaders would customarily have met beforehand to hammer out a coalition agreement before their meeting with the King.

Government and the Cortes sit for a term no longer than four years when the prime minister tenders his resignation to the king and advises the king to dissolve the Cortes, prompting a general election. It remains within the king's prerogative to dissolve the Cortes if, at the conclusion of the four years, the prime minister has not asked for its dissolution, according to Title II Section 56. The king may call for earlier elections on the advice of the prime minister, known as a snap election, but no sooner than a year after the prior general election. Additionally, if the Government loses the confidence of the Cortes, then it must resign.

If a prime minister resigns without advising the monarch to call for new elections, dies or becomes incapacitated while in office, then the government as a whole resigns and the process of royal nomination and appointment takes place. The deputy prime minister, or in the absence of such office the first minister by precedence, would then take over the day-to-day operations in the meantime as acting-prime minister, even while the deputy prime minister themselves may be nominated by the king and stand for a vote of confidence.

The prime minister's position is strengthened by constitutional limits on the Congress' right to withdraw confidence from the government. Following the German model, a prime minister can only be removed by a constructive vote of no confidence. While the Congress can censure the government at any time, the censure motion must also include the name of a prospective replacement for the incumbent prime minister. If the censure motion is successful, the replacement candidate is automatically deemed to have the confidence of the Congress, and the monarch is required to appoint him as the new prime minister.

Constitutional authority
Title IV of the Constitution defines the government and its responsibilities. The government consists of the president of the Government and ministers of state. The government conducts domestic and foreign policy, civil and military administration, and the defense of the nation all in the name of the king on behalf of the people. Additionally, the government exercises executive authority and statutory regulations.

There is no provision in the Spanish Constitution for explicitly granting any emergency powers to the government, which could be understood as exorcising the ghost of the recent dictatorship in Spain. However, Title II, Sections 56 of the constitution vests the monarch as the "arbitrator and moderator of the institutions" of government, [The King] arbitrates and moderates the regular functioning of the institutions (arbitra y modera el funcionamiento regular de las instituciones). This provision could be understood as allowing the king or his government ministers to exercise emergency authority in times of national crisis, such as when the king used his authority to back the government of the day and call for the military to abandon the 23-F coup attempt in 1981.

The prime minister also assumes political responsibility for most acts of the king. While the king is vested with executive power, his acts are not valid unless countersigned by a minister. Under Article 64 of the Constitution, that minister—usually the prime minister—assumes political responsibility for the act in question.

Return of democracy

Adolfo Suárez was the first democratically elected prime minister of the post-Franco government, the 149th Spanish prime minister since 1834. He was appointed by King Juan Carlos on 3 July 1976. In the 1977 Spanish general election his position as prime minister was confirmed by a vote.

Peerages

Peerages in Spain are created by the Grace of the King, according to the Spanish Ministry of Justice, and are the highest marks of distinction that he may bestow in his capacity as the fons honorum in Spain. Conventionally, the Title of Concession creating the dignity must be countersigned by a government minister. When a title is created for a former president, the succeeding president customarily countersigns the royal decree. As a reward for national service, the king awarded peerages to two of his former presidents who have since retired from active politics: Adolfo Suárez was created 1st Duke of Suárez; and Leopoldo Calvo-Sotelo was created 1st . Additional titles of nobility have been created by the king for other government ministers, usually at the advice of the president of the government.

As of 2005, the king has created forty hereditary titles of nobility.

Recent prime ministers

Timeline

See also
Elections in Spain
List of prime ministers of Spain
Politics of Spain
Cabinet Office (Spain)

References

 
Government of Spain
Politics of Spain
Spanish Prime Minister's Office